Viena Balen (born 18 August 1986) is a road cyclist from Croatia. She represented her nation at the 2007 and 2009 UCI Road World Championships.

References

External links
 

1986 births
Croatian female cyclists
Living people
People from Opatija